The eastern gate in Delft, Netherlands, is an example of Brick Gothic northern European architecture that was built around 1400. Around 1510, the towers were enhanced with an additional octagonal floor and high spires. This is the only city gate remaining in Delft; the others were demolished in the 19th century. It currently serves as an art gallery and private residence. 

Rijksmonuments in Delft
Gates in the Netherlands
Brick Gothic